George Frederick Sprague (September 3, 1902 – November 24, 1998) was an American geneticist and maize researcher. He was a faculty member at the Iowa State University and the University of Illinois and a researcher at the U.S. Department of Agriculture. He is credited with developing a genetically strong line of maize known as Iowa Stiff Stalk Synthetic. A recipient of the Wolf Prize in Agriculture, Sprague was also a fellow of the American Association for the Advancement of Science and a member of the National Academy of Sciences.

Biography
Sprague was born in Crete, Nebraska. He was the son of Lucy Manville Sprague and minister Elmer Ellsworth Sprague. After graduating from Lincoln High School, he received an undergraduate degree from the University of Nebraska-Lincoln and a Ph.D. from Cornell University under supervision of Rollins A. Emerson.

Sprague was a professor at Iowa State University. At Iowa State, Sprague realized that open-pollinated corn often suffered from weak roots and stalks. After intermating 16 lines known to have strong stalks and roots, Sprague created Iowa Stiff Stalk Synthetic. This variety was still used in corn breeding as of 2008. Sprague's techniques took advantage of his belief that good germplasm was crucial to successful breeding.

Leaving Iowa State for the USDA Agricultural Research Service (ARS) in 1958, Sprague led the Corn and Sorghum Investigations Unit. He served as president of the American Society of Agronomy in 1960. Sprague retired from the ARS in 1972 and took a research position at the University of Illinois, where he was employed until 1994. In 1998, Sprague died at his home in Eugene, Oregon.

Honors
Sprague was inducted into the ARS Science Hall of Fame in 1990. He was a fellow of the American Association for the Advancement of Science. He was elected to the National Academy of Sciences and he later chaired the organization's section on applied biology. Sprague shared the 1978 Wolf Prize in Agriculture with plant pathologist John Charles Walker. In 2007, Iowa State University Department of Agronomy established the George F. Sprague Endowed Chair.

References

External links
Google Scholar search for G. F. Sprague

1902 births
1998 deaths
American geneticists
People from Crete, Nebraska
University of Nebraska–Lincoln alumni
Cornell University alumni
Iowa State University faculty
United States Department of Agriculture people
Members of the United States National Academy of Sciences
University of Illinois faculty
Fellows of the American Association for the Advancement of Science
Presidents of the American Society of Agronomy
20th-century agronomists